The UK Singles Chart is one of many music charts compiled by the Official Charts Company that calculates the best-selling singles of the week in the United Kingdom. Before 2004, the chart was only based on the sales of physical singles. This list shows singles that peaked in the Top 10 of the UK Singles Chart during 1977, as well as songs which peaked in 1976 and 1978 but were in the top 10 in 1977. The entry date is when the song appeared in the top 10 for the first time (week ending, as published by the Official Charts Company, which is six days after the chart is announced).

One-hundred and seventeen songs were in the top ten in 1977. Eleven singles from 1976 remained in the top 10 for several weeks at the beginning of the year, while "It's a Heartache" by Bonnie Tyler and "Love's Unkind" by Donna Summer were both released in 1977 but did not reach their peak until 1978. "Portsmouth by Mike Oldfield, "Living Next Door to Alice" by Smokie and "Dr. Love" by Tina Charles were the songs from 1976 to reach their peak in 1977. Nineteen artists scored multiple entries in the top 10 in 1977. David Soul, Boney M., Deniece Williams, the Sex Pistols and Darts were among the many artists who achieved their first UK charting top 10 single in 1977.

The 1976 Christmas number-one, "When a Child Is Born" by Johnny Mathis, remained at number-one for the first week of 1977. The first new number-one single of the year was "Don't Give Up on Us" by David Soul. Overall, eighteen different songs peaked at number-one in 1977, with ABBA and David Soul (2) having the joint most songs hit that position.

Background

Multiple entries
One-hundred and seventeen singles charted in the top 10 in 1977, with one-hundred and seven singles reaching their peak this year.

Nineteen artists scored multiple entries in the top 10 in 1977. Boney M. and Showaddywaddy shared the record for most top 10 hits in 1977 with four hit singles each. Showaddywaddy's collection including the number-one single "Under the Moon of Love" from the end of the previous year, which remained in the top 10 for the first three weeks of 1977. Boney M. made their top 10 debut in January with the number six hit "Daddy Cool".

American-British actor and singer David Soul made the top 10 on three occasions in 1977, including the second-biggest selling single of the year "Don't Give Up on Us". Disco legend Donna Summer also had a very successful year, also scoring three top 10 entries, including the number-one hit "I Feel Love". Elvis Presley was another artist who had three top 10 entries this year, and following his death in August, he reached number-one for five weeks with his single "Way Down".

The Sex Pistols made their top 10 debut at number two in June with "God Save the Queen", and scored two further entries in 1977 with "Pretty Vacant" and "Holidays in the Sun", which peaked at numbers six and eight respectively.

Brotherhood of Man were one of a number of artists with two top-ten entries, including the number-one single "Angelo". 10cc, Deniece Williams, Leo Sayer, Queen and Rod Stewart were among the other artists who had multiple top 10 entries in 1977.

Chart debuts
Fifty-four artists achieved their first top 10 single in 1977, either as a lead or featured artist. Of these, three went on to record another hit single that year: Deniece Williams, Elkie Brooks and Julie Covington. David Soul, Sex Pistols and The Stranglers all recorded two more top 10 singles in 1977. Boney M. had three other entries in their breakthrough year.

The following table (collapsed on desktop site) does not include acts who had previously charted as part of a group and secured their first top 10 solo single.

{| class="wikitable sortable mw-collapsible mw-collapsed" style="text-align: center;"
|-
! scope="col" style="width:55px;"| Artist
! scope="col" style="width:55px;" data-sort-type="number"| Number of top 10s
! scope="col" style="text-align:center;"| First entry
! scope="col" style="width:55px;" data-sort-type="number"| Chart position
! scope="col" style="text-align:center;"| Other entries
|-
|David Soul
|3
|"Don't Give Up on Us"
|1
|"Going In with My Eyes Wide Open" (2), "Silver Lady" (1)
|-
|Paul Nicholas
|1
|"Grandma's Party"
|9
|—
|-
|Barry Biggs
|1
|"Sideshow"
|3
|—
|-
|Julie Covington
|2
|"Don't Cry for Me Argentina"
|1
|"O.K.?" (10)
|-
|David Parton
|1
|"Isn't She Lovely"
|4
|—
|-
|Boney M.
|4
|"Daddy Cool"
|6
|"Sunny" (3), "Ma Baker" (2), "Belfast" (8)
|-
|Rose Royce
|1
|"Car Wash"
|9
|—
|-
|Heatwave
|1
|"Boogie Nights"
|2
|—
|-
|
|1
|"Chanson D'Amour"
|1
|—
|-
|
|1
|"Sing Me" 
|8
|—
|-
|Mr Big
|1
|"Romeo"
|4
|—
|-
|Boz Scaggs
|1
|"What Can I Say"
|10
|—
|-
|Mary MacGregor
|1
|"Torn Between Two Lovers"
|4
|—
|-
|Berni Flint
|1
|"I Don't Want to Put a Hold on You"
|3
|—
|-
|Marilyn McCoo
|rowspan="2"|1
|rowspan="2"|"You Don't Have to Be a Star (To Be in My Show)"
|rowspan="2"|7
|rowspan="2"|—
|-
|Billy Davis Jr.
|-
|Deniece Williams
|2
|"Free"
|1
|"That's What Friends Are For" (8)
|-
|
|1
|"Have I the Right?"
|6
|—
|-
|Elkie Brooks
|2
|"Pearl's a Singer" 
|8
|"Sunshine After the Rain" (10)
|-
|Joe Tex
|1
|"Ain't Gonna Bump No More (With No Big Fat Woman)"
|2
|—
|-
|Van McCoy
|1
|"The Shuffle"
|4
|—
|-
|Eagles
|1
|"Hotel California"
|8
|—
|-
|Barbra Streisand
|1
|"Evergreen (Love Theme from A Star Is Born )|3
|—
|-
|Piero Umiliani
|1
|"Mah Nà Mah Nà"
|8
|—
|-
|
|1
|"Halfway Down the Stairs"
|7
|—
|-
|Charlotte Cornwell
|rowspan="3"|1
|rowspan="3"|"O.K.?" 
|rowspan="3"|10
|rowspan="3"|—
|-
|Rula Lenska
|-
|Sue Jones-Davies
|-
|Sex Pistols
|3
|"God Save the Queen"
|2
|"Pretty Vacant" (6), "Holidays in the Sun" (8)
|-
|Carole Bayer Sager
|1
|"You're Moving Out Today"
|6
|—
|-
|Emerson, Lake & Palmer
|1
|"Fanfare for the Common Man"
|2
|—
|-
|
|3
|"Peaches"
|8
|"Something Better Change" (9), "No More Heroes" (8)
|-
|Alessi
|1
|"Oh Lori"
|8
|—
|-
|Rita Coolidge
|1
|"We're All Alone"
|6
|—
|-
|
|1
|"Float On"
|1
|—
|-
|The Rah Band
|1
|"The Crunch"
|6
|—
|-
|Space
|1
|"Magic Fly"
|2
|—
|-
|Jean-Michel Jarre
|1
|"Oxygène Part IV"
|4
|—
|-
|Meri Wilson
|1
|"Telephone Man"
|6
|—
|-
|
|1
|"Best of My Love"
|4
|—
|-
|
|1
|"Do Anything You Wanna Do"
|9
|—
|-
|La Belle Epoque
|1
|"Black Is Black"
|2
|—
|-
|Patsy Gallant
|1
|"From New York to L.A."
|2
|—
|-
|Yes
|1
|"Wonderous Stories"
|7
|—
|-
|Danny Mirror
|1
|"I Remember Elvis Presley (The King Is Dead)"
|4
|—
|-
|Baccara
|1
|"Yes Sir, I Can Boogie"
|1
|—
|-
|Meco
|1
|"Star Wars Theme"
|7
|—
|-
|Ram Jam
|1
|"Black Betty"
|7
|—
|-
|Tom Robinson Band
|1
|"2-4-6-8 Motorway"
|5
|—
|-
|Darts
|1
|"Daddy Cool"/"The Girl Can't Help It"
|6
|—
|-
|Ruby Winters
|1
|"I Will"
|4
|—
|-
|Brighouse and Rastrick Brass Band
|1
|"The Floral Dance"
|2
|—
|-
|Jonathan Richman and The Modern Lovers
|1
|"Egyptian Reggae"
|5
|—
|-
|
|1
|"Love of My Life"
|9
|—
|-
|}

Notes
Kenny Rogers had his first hit single independent of his group The First Edition, with "Lucille" topping the chart. The Jacksons previously charted as The Jackson 5, their name having been changed in 1976 as Jermaine Jackson was replaced by Randy Jackson in the group. One member of Emerson, Lake and Palmer - Greg Lake - had reached number 2 as a solo artist in 1975 with the Christmas song "I Believe in Father Christmas". Jonathan Richman was lead singer of The Modern Lovers. The group were simply known as The Modern Lovers but changed their name in 1976.

Songs from films
Original songs from various films entered the top 10 throughout the year. These included "Car Wash" (from Car Wash), "Evergreen (Love Theme from "A Star Is Born" )",  (A Star Is Born), "Mah Nà Mah Nà" (Sweden: Heaven and Hell), "Nobody Does It Better" (The Spy Who Loved Me), "Down Deep Inside" (The Deep), "How Deep Is Your Love" (Saturday Night Fever) and "White Christmas" (Holiday Inn and White Christmas'').

Best-selling singles
Wings had the best-selling single of the year with "Mull of Kintyre"/"Girls' School". The song spent twelve weeks in the top 10 (including nine weeks at number one) and was certified platinum by the BPI. "Don't Give Up on Us" by David Soul came in second place. Julie Covington's "Don't Cry for Me Argentina", "When I Need You" from Leo Sayer and "Silver Lady" by David Soul made up the top five. Songs by ABBA, Donna Summer, Elvis Presley, Hot Chocolate and Brotherhood of Man were also in the top ten best-selling singles of the year.

Top-ten singles
Key

Entries by artist
 

 

The following table shows artists who achieved two or more top 10 entries in 1977, including singles that reached their peak in 1976 or 1978. The figures include both main artists and featured artists, while appearances on ensemble charity records are also counted for each artist. The total number of weeks an artist spent in the top ten in 1976 is also shown.

Notes

 "Lean on Me" re-entered the top 10 at number 10 on 8 January 1977 (week ending).
 "This Is Tomorrow" re-entered the top 10 at number 9 on 12 March 1977 (week ending).
 "Easy" re-entered the top 10 at number 9 on 13 August 1977 (week ending).
 "That's What Friends Are For" re-entered the top 10 at number 10 on 24 September 1977 (week ending).
 "Black Betty" re-entered the top 10 at number 8 on 12 November 1977 (week ending).
 Figure includes single that peaked in 1976.
 Figure includes single that peaked in 1978.
 Figure includes single that first charted in 1976 but peaked in 1977.

See also
1977 in British music
List of number-one singles from the 1970s (UK)

References
General

Specific

External links
1977 singles chart archive at the Official Charts Company (click on relevant week)

Top 10 singles
United Kingdom
1977